Vesiculentomon is a genus of proturans in the family Acerentomidae.

Species
 Vesiculentomon marshalli Rusek, 1974
 Vesiculentomon ruseki Nosek, 1977

References

Protura